Paradise Records was an American record label founded by Leon Russell in 1976 in Burbank, California.

History
Paradise Records was the second record label company founded by Russell, the first being Shelter Records which Russell co-founded with Denny Cordell in 1969. Russell ran Shelter with Cordell until 1976, when the two had a falling out. In a settlement, Cordell became sole owner of the Shelter Records label, and Russell left to start his own label, Paradise Records.

Paradise Records was learning place for Steve Ripley and members of Concrete Blonde; Ripley later started the country retro group, The Tractors.

Paradise Records are currently made and distributed by Warner Bros. Records.

Paradise Studios
Paradise Records included Paradise Studios, a recording studio complex with two audio sound stages and one television production stage, as well as a remote recording bus and a remote television production bus that could support the stages or travel. The studio aired a weekly live television music show New Wave Theatre shown on USA Network. The studio produced music videos for James Taylor and Randy Meisner, and long-format videos for Willie Nelson, J.J.Cale, Bonnie Raitt and Leon Russell.

Russell sold the complex in 1982, after which it was home to Alpha Studios and then Oracle Post. In 2014, the facility became Bang Zoom! Entertainment's second multi-room production facility.

Distribution history
 In 1976 Paradise Records released its first album, the Wedding Album by Leon and Mary Russell. It is a studio album with his then wife, Mary Russell, otherwise known as Mary McCreary. It was distributed by Warner Bros. Records. Leon and Mary Russell were producers of the album, with the exception of the final track, "Daylight", which was produced by its writer, Bobby Womack. Leon and then-wife Mary Russell were musical guests on the May 15, 1976, episode of Saturday Night Live in its first season, hosted by Dyan Cannon.
 In 1976 Leon & Mary Russell released Rainbow In Your Eyes/ Love's Supposed To Be That Way a Single
 In 1976 Leon & Mary Russell released Satisfy You / Windsong  a 7" Promo single.
 In 1997 Leon & Mary Russell released Make Love to the Music an LP, Album
 In 1977 Gary Ogan released Gary Ogan an LP, Album.
 In 1977 Gary Ogan released The Road a 7" single
 In 1977 Leon & Mary Russell released 	Say You Will 7" single
 In 1977 Leon & Mary Russell released 	Love Crazy 7" single
 In 1977 Leon & Mary Russell released 	Easy Love 7" single
 In 1977 Gary Ogan released Make Me Sing
 In 1978 Leon Russell released Elvis And Marilyn a 7" single.  	
 In 1978 Leon Russell released Americana an LP Album 
 In 1978 Leon Russell released From Maine To Mexico a 7" single  	
 In 1978 Leon Russell released Elvis And Marilyn / Anita Bryant a 12" Promo
 In 1979 Leon Russell released Life And Love an LP  Album.
 In 1979 Mary Russell released	Heart Of Fire Album
 In 1979 Wornell Jones released Wornell Jones an LP, Album.
 In 1979 Mary Russell released	Right Or Wrong / Up Against The Wall  a 7" single.
 In 1979 Mary Russell released	Up Against The Wall a 7", Promo single.
 In 1979 Wornell Jones released You Are My Happiness a 7", Promo single.
 In 1981 following up on his country theme, Leon released a second Hank Wilson album, Hank Wilson, Vol. II. Hank Wilson being Leon's pseudonym name.
 In 1981 Leon Russell & New Grass Revival released a The Live Album In 1981 Leon Russell & New Grass Revival released a I've Just Seen A Face a 7", Promo single.
 In 1984 Leon Russell released Hank Wilson - Wabash Cannonball  a 7", Promo single.
 In 1984 Leon Russell released Solid State Album.
 In 1984 Leon Russell re-released Hank Wilson Vol. II a LP, Album.
 In 1984 Leon Russell released Good Time Charlie's Got The Blues a 7", Promo.
 In 1984 Leon Russell released Rescue My Heart a  7", Single.
 In 1984 Billy Chinnock released The Way She Makes Love a 7", Promo single.
 In 1984 Leon Russell released  Oh Lonesome Me a 7", Promo.
 In 1985 Paul Black And The Flip Kings released How How an LP, Album.
 In 1993 Paradise Records released the LEON RUSSELL 24K GOLD DISC album. A remix of recordings done at Olympic Sound in London in 1969.
 In 1997 Paradise Records released  Blues: Same Old Song.
 In 2012 Astronomy released Bali Moon a CD, Album.
 In 2012 Astronomy released Golden Disc a CDr Single.
 In 2012 Astronomy released Bali Moon a CDr Single.

See also
 Takoma Records
 Swamp pop
 Blues
 Country music

References

External links
 Paradise Records discography

American record labels
Record labels established in 1976
Record labels disestablished in 2012